The St. Andrews Knights football program represents St. Andrews University of Laurinburg, North Carolina in college football. They are football-only members of the Mid-South Conference and compete at the National Association of Intercollegiate Athletics (NAIA) level. 2017 was their first season of football.

References

External links
 

 
American football teams established in 2017
2017 establishments in North Carolina